Samarai-Murua District is a district of the Milne Bay Province of Papua New Guinea.  Its capital is Murua.  The population of the district was 58,590 at the 2011 census.

The district derives its name from the islands of Samarai and Woodlark Island, the latter also being called Murua.

References

Districts of Papua New Guinea
Milne Bay Province